Nour Belkhiria is a Tunisian-Canadian actress from Montreal, Quebec. She is most noted for her performance as Ismène in the film Antigone, for which she won the Canadian Screen Award for Best Supporting Actress at the 8th Canadian Screen Awards.

She received a Prix Iris nomination for Best Actress at the 24th Quebec Cinema Awards in 2022, for her performance as Nacira in A Revision (Une révision).

References

External links

Canadian film actresses
Actresses from Montreal
Living people
Year of birth missing (living people)
Best Supporting Actress Genie and Canadian Screen Award winners
Canadian people of Tunisian descent